Don Alessandro Torlonia, 5th Prince of Civitella-Cesi (7 December 1911 – 1 May/12 May 1986) was an Italian banking heir and a member of the House of Torlonia.

About 
Born in Rome on 7 December 1911, Torlonia was the son of Marino Torlonia, 4th Prince di Civitella-Cesi and his American wife, Mary Elsie Moore. Don Alessandro's youngest sister was Donna Marina Torlonia di Civitella-Cesi, grandmother of the American actress Brooke Shields. Thus he was Shields's grand-uncle. On the death of his father in 1933, he inherited large estates as well as his father's princely and other titles.

In 1941, when his mother was dying in New York City, Torlonia took a high speed boat from Portugal and was arrested in error by FBI, thinking he was an enemy of the state and taken to Ellis Island.

In the 1980s, Torlonia held the title as the "richest man in Rome", as he was the heir to a banking fortune. He died in the Palazzo Torlonia, Rome, in 1986.

Marriage and children

On 14 January 1935, Don Alessandro morganatically married in Rome the Infanta Beatriz of Spain (1909–2002), a daughter of King Alfonso XIII of Spain and of Princess Victoria Eugenie of Battenberg.

Don Alessandro and Infanta Beatriz had four children:
 Donna Alessandra ("Sandra") Vittoria Torlonia (1936–2014), married to Count Clemente Lecquio di Assaba (1925–1971); they have two children: Count Alessandro Lecquio di Assaba and Donna Desideria Lecquio di Assaba (Countess Oddone Tournon).
 Marco Torlonia, 6th Prince di Civitella-Cesi, (1937–2014) who married firstly Donna Orsetta Caracciolo dei principi di Castagneto, secondly Philippa Catherine McDonald and thirdly Blažena Anna Helena Svitáková.
 Don Marino Riccardo Francesco Giuseppe Torlonia (1939–1995)
 Donna Olimpia Emmanuela Enrichetta Maria Torlonia (born 1943), who married the French millionaire Paul-Annik Weiller, son of Paul-Louis Weiller. They have issue:
 Sibilla Weiller (born 1968), wife of Prince Guillaume of Luxembourg.

Ancestry

Notes and references

Morganatic spouses
Civitella-Cesi, Prince
Civitella-Cesi, Prince
Alessandro 5th Prince Di Civitella-Cesi
Civitella-Cesi
Princes of Civitella-Cesi